Gorasara is a village located in Dildarnagar Kamsar, Uttar Pradesh, India.

As of the 2011 Census of India, the main population of the village lived in an area of 87.5 acres of land with 637 households.

Agriculture

The soil of the village is rich in minerals. The water level of the village is less than 100 feet deep. The village land extends to the banks of Karmansa River. As of the 2011 census, the area of the village is 983.38 acres. Mango and other tree farms cover 162 acres of land and ponds cover 18 acres, with the rest of the land dedicated to other crop production. Many types of crops that grow in the nearby Ghazipur and Buxar districts are grown in the village.

Gorasara has been known for its sunflower farming for more than 300 years. During the summer, sunflowers are planted on a large scale in the village, usually on more than 500 acres of land. Flowers are sent to other cities, states and countries. Sunflowers were used to make sunflower oil in the village during the Mughal and British eras. Rose farming is also done on a large scale. The village is known for its rose plantation done every year to make rose water. Every year different breeds of sunflower and rose are planted on a large scale in the village.

Plantation
When Goarasar village was established by Bhikham Khan, his son Fateh Bahadur Khan build a large orchard in the village which was named Hazara Bagh. The orchard built by Fateh took over an area of 300 bigha and had more than 9,100 trees. Now the orchard is small with an area of almost 120 bigha and is owned by the family of Fateh Bahadur Khan as of 2015.

Historical population

Gallery

References

Dildarnagar Fatehpur
Cities and towns in Ghazipur district
Towns and villages in Kamsar
Villages in Ghazipur district